The LSU Tigers baseball program is a college baseball team that represents Louisiana State University in the Western Division of the Southeastern Conference in the National Collegiate Athletic Association. The team has had 25 head coaches since it started playing organized baseball in the 1893 season. The current coach is Jay Johnson, who was recently hired last November.

Since its creation in 1947, three LSU coaches; Skip Bertman, Smoke Laval and Paul Mainieri have led the Tigers to the College World Series with Bertman and Mainieri winning six national championships. Seven coaches have won conference championships with LSU: Harry Rabenhorst, A. L. Swanson, Ray Didier, Jim Smith, Bertman, Laval and Mainieri have all won Southeastern Conference championships.

Skip Bertman is the all-time leader in games coached (1,203) and total wins (870). Harry Rabenhorst is the all-time leader in seasons coached (27). E. B. Young has the highest winning percentage of any Tiger coach with a 1–0–0 record (1.000) in his one season at LSU. Moon Ducote has the lowest winning percentage (.308) in his one season at LSU.

In 2006, Bertman was inducted into the National College Baseball Hall of Fame.

Key

Coaches

Notes

Sources:

References

LSU

LSU Tigers baseball coaches